Saint-Clet may refer to:
Saint-Clet, Côtes-d'Armor, Brittany, France
Saint-Clet, Quebec, Canada

See also
 Clet, a surname
 Pope Anacletus (died c. 92), also known as Saint Cletus